Borussia VfB Neunkirchen is a German association football club based in Neunkirchen, Saarland. The club SC Borussia Neunkirchen was founded out of the 1907 merger of FC 1905 Borussia and SC Neunkirchen.

History

From 1912 through to 1963 the club had an uninterrupted record of first division play including the Kreisliga Saar, Bezirksliga Rhein-Saar and selection to the Gauliga, formed in 1933 through the reorganization of German football under the Third Reich. Borussia remained at this level, in the Gauliga Südwest/Mainhessen, throughout the league's history, with good results but not winning a league championship. Like other organizations in the country, including sports and football associations, Borussia was dissolved by the Allied occupation authorities after World War II, but was quickly reformed under its current name.

The club played in the French-occupied Saarland and the French made various efforts to see the state become independent of Germany or join France. In sport this was manifested as separate 1952 Olympic and 1954 World Cup teams for Saarland, the establishment of a short-lived football league for the state, and the German club 1. FC Saarbrücken playing in the French second division. Neunkirchen played in the Saarland Ehrenliga from 1949 to 1951, winning the title in the first year and finishing as runner-up the next. They were able to re-join the DFB (Deutscher Fußball-Bund or German Football Association) after the 1950–51 season in the Oberliga Südwest.

Despite their record of continuous play at the top flight, Neunkirchen was not one of the sixteen sides selected for play in the Bundesliga – Germany's new professional football league – at its formation. Along with FK Pirmasens and Wormatia Worms, they were bypassed in favour of 1. FC Saarbrücken, even though they all had better records than the chosen side. More than a few protests were lodged as 1. FC appeared to have gained entry based simply on their affiliation with a member of the league selection committee. Their entry was delayed by only a year as they were able to play their way into the upper league through the promotion rounds after winning the Regionalliga Südwest.

Their stay in the Bundesliga was short-lived. After a mid-table result in 1965, they would be relegated the following season after a 17th-place finish. They won the Regionalliga Südwest again after being sent down and returned to the Bundesliga to another 17th-place finish and relegation.

Neunkirchen spent another seven years playing tier II football before slipping to the Amateurliga Saarland (III). Through the mid-1970s and into the early 1980s the club bounced up and down between these levels of play, before settling in for a decade and a half at tier III. The team slipped again in 1996 to the Oberliga Südwest (IV). They won their division in 2005 but declined the opportunity to apply for a license and promotion to the third division because of financial problems that have plagued the club since 2003. From 2012–13 the Oberliga Südwest was renamed Oberliga Rheinland-Pfalz/Saar, with Borussia continuing in this league.

In April 2015 the club had to declare insolvency with a debt of €280,000.

Honours
The club's honours:

League
 Oberliga Südwest (I)
 Champions: 1962
 Runners-up: 1959, 1960, 1961, 1963
 Bezirksliga Rheinhessen-Saar (I)
 Champions: 1924
 Bezirksliga Rhein-Saar (Saar division) (I)
 Champions: 1929
 Kreisliga Saar (I)
 Champions: 1921, 1922, 1923
 Regionalliga Südwest (II)
 Champions: 1964, 1967, 1971, 1972, 1974
 Oberliga Südwest (III-IV)
 Champions: 1980, 1991, 2000, 2002, 2005
 Amateurliga Saarland (III)
 Champions: 1976, 1977, 1978
 Ehrenliga Saarland (II)
 Champions: 1949
 Runners-up: 1950

Cup
 Southern German Cup
 Winners: 1921
 Saarland Cup (Tiers III-VII)
 Winners: 1978, 1985, 1986, 1990, 1992, 1996, 2003
 Runners-up: 1995, 1997, 2001, 2008, 2010

Recent seasons
The recent season-by-season performance of the club:

 With the introduction of the Regionalligas in 1994 and the 3. Liga in 2008 as the new third tier, below the 2. Bundesliga, all leagues below dropped one tier. The Saarlandliga was introduced in 2009 and replaced the Verbandsliga Saarland at the sixth tier of football in the Saarland. In 2012 the Oberliga Südwest was renamed Oberliga Rheinland-Pfalz/Saar.

Current squad

References

External links
 The Abseits Guide to German Soccer
 Borussia Neunkirchen at Weltfussball.de
 Das deutsche Fußball-Archiv historical German domestic league tables 

 
Football clubs in Germany
Football clubs in Saarland
Borussia
Association football clubs established in 1905
1905 establishments in Germany
Bundesliga clubs
2. Bundesliga clubs